Ignăței is a village in Rezina District, Moldova.

Notable people
 Pavel Cocârlă 
 Vasile Bârcă

References

Villages of Rezina District